Alan Grieco (born May 7, 1946) is a former American cyclist. He competed in the men's sprint at the 1964 Summer Olympics.

References

External links
 
 

1946 births
Living people
American male cyclists
Olympic cyclists of the United States
Cyclists at the 1964 Summer Olympics
People from Lyndhurst, New Jersey
Sportspeople from Bergen County, New Jersey